The 1941 Duke Blue Devils football team was an American football team that represented Duke University as a member of the Southern Conference during the 1941 college football season. In their 11th season under head coach Wallace Wade, the Blue Devils compiled a 9–0 record during the regular season, won the Southern Conference championship, and outscored opponents by a total of 311 to 41. Ranked No. 2 in the final AP Poll, the Blue Devils were invited to play in the 1942 Rose Bowl (played at Duke Stadium), losing to Oregon State by a 20–16 score.

Four Duke players were selected as first-team players on the 1941 All-Southern Conference football team: halfback Steve Lach, left tackle Mike Karmazin, right end Bob Gantt, and center Bob Barnett. Lach was also selected by the International News Service, Liberty magazine, and the Newspaper Enterprise Association as a first-team player on the 1941 All-America team. Lach was also later inducted into the College Football Hall of Fame.

One minor selector, Ray Bryne, selected Duke as national champion.

Schedule

References

Duke
Duke Blue Devils football seasons
Southern Conference football champion seasons
Duke Blue Devils football